George Howe Colt is an American journalist and author.

He is the author of November of the Soul: The Enigma of Suicide (1991), The Big House (2003), Brothers (2012), and The Game (2018). He is married to author Anne Fadiman.

Colt was a staff writer for Life. His 2003 book about his last summer with his family at their summer house on Cape Cod, The Big House, was a finalist for the National Book Award.

He graduated from Harvard University. His uncle was the lawyer and politician James Colt; the Colts are related to the prominent Forbes family, through which a distant cousin is the politician and diplomat John Kerry.

Bibliography

Books 
 The Enigma of Suicide, 1991, Scribner
 November of the Soul: The Enigma of Suicide, 2006, Scribner
 The Big House: A Century in the Life of an American Summer Home, 2003, Scribner
 Brothers: On His Brothers and Brothers in History, 2012, Scribner
 The Game: Harvard, Yale, and America in 1968, 2018, Scribner

Magazine articles 
 Colt, George Howe, article on "Westchester cluster" of suicides that served as a source for his book, LIFE, 1984
 Colt, George Howe & Hollister, Anne, "How Earthquakes Happen," LIFE, February 1989
 Colt, George Howe, "See Me, Feel Me, Touch Me, Heal Me," LIFE, Sept. 1996
 Colt, George Howe, "Were You Born That Way?," LIFE, 1998

References

American male writers
Living people
Place of birth missing (living people)
Year of birth missing (living people)
Harvard University alumni